Tabebuia striata is a species of plant in the family Bignoniaceae. It is found in Colombia and Panama. It is threatened by habitat loss.

References

striata
Vulnerable plants
Taxonomy articles created by Polbot